The president of Piedmont is the head of the government of the region. The presidents elected between 1970 and 1995 were elected by the Regional Council of Piedmont. Later they were directly elected by the population.

This is the list of presidents of Piedmont since 1970.

Politics of Piedmont
Piedmont